Daxue Road is a small but historical street in Chengdu, China, now a tourist attraction. The meaning of its name in Chinese is “University Road”, as it was first a road near West China Union University in 1910, now the Huaxi Campus of Sichuan University.

Orientation
Daxue Road is located in the south of Chengdu, running a west–east direction. It begins from South Renmin Road (人民南路) and continues eastward towards Hongxing Road (红星路).

History

Beginning of 20th Century
In 1905, West China Union Middle School was established as a union intervention of the American Mutual Foreign Mission Society, the Friends' Foreign Mission Association of Great Britain and Ireland, the General Board of Missions of the Methodist Church of Canada, (later the United Church of Canada) and the Board of Foreign Missions of the Methodist Episcopal Church USA. Then West China Union University opened in 1910 under the same supervision and built according to the plans set out mainly by Fred Rowntree. The Daxue Road was one of the interior roads of the university at that time. Moreover, it was called "Main road to city south gate" and "road to city east gate" as the gateway road of the university to the city. On the north side of the street there were mainly dormitories of university students and staff accommodations of West China Union Middle School and on the south side were the teaching area of the university. Along the street, there are the Whiting Memorial Administration Building, The Lamont Library and Harvard-Yenching Museum, education offices (no longer existing), Religious Room (no longer existing), etc.

After the foundation of the PRC to the 21st Century
As the mushrooming of urban construction in Chengdu, in 1960, the newly planned South Renmin Road separated the university into two parts. And as the increasing of residence housings built in and around this district, Daxue Road, from an interior university road, gradually became a city street serving all the citizens. In the 1990s, it was one of the major markets in Chengdu, named as "Daxue Road Market". Between every phoenix tree, there was one or two stalls, strengthened to the pedestrian area. The total area of the market reached about 8,000 m2. During the night, there was a night market, with mobile stalls selling cheap food and small commodities everywhere. Pedestrians, bicycles and cars all went through in the center of the road.

2006 to present
In 2006, the Chengdu government listed Daxue Road as one of the important reforming Culture Blocks. A new Market building was built and all the former vendors had been asked to move in. Buildings along the street had been repainted. Brick walls enclosing the campus had been replaced by iron railings or hedges in order that people walking on the street could see the campus buildings. After this renewal, although on the ground floor of the buildings along this street are mostly small restaurants and groceries, Daxue Road became one of the main transportation roads west-east orientation of Chengdu.

Sightseeing
Along the street, there are two buildings listed in the Heritage buildings in Chengdu in 2001.

The Whiting Memorial Administration Building
The Whiting Memorial Administration Building was originally the studio of West China Union University. It was built from 1915 to 1919, designed by British Architect Fred Rowntree, who was also the main designer of the whole campus. It used the inverted arched technology at that time, which was advanced during that time. Now, this building is used as the office building of Huaxi Campus of Sichuan University.

The Lamont Library and Harvard-Yenching Museum
The Lamont Library and Harvard-Yenching Museum finished being constructed in 1926 and is now used as the Campus History Museum of Sichuan University.

References

External links

Streets in Chengdu
Tourist attractions in Chengdu
History of Chengdu
Restaurant districts and streets in China
Shopping districts and streets in China